Gaocheng is a township of Xinfu District, Xinzhou, Shanxi province, China, located  north of downtown Xinzhou. G55 Erenhot–Guangzhou Expressway and China National Highway 208 pass just to the west of the township. , it has 9 villages under its administration. 
Gaocheng Village
Jinshanpu Village
Houyuni Village
Qianyuni Village
Yongfengzhuang Village
Zhang Village
Wangfuzhuang Village
Xinkou Village
Nanpu Village

See also 
 List of township-level divisions of Shanxi

References 

Township-level divisions of Shanxi
Xinzhou